Trnje is a settlement in the Municipality of Škofja Loka in the Upper Carniola region of Slovenia.

Mass grave

Trnje is the site of a mass grave associated with World War II. It contains the remains of seven victims believed to be Home Guard prisoners of war from nearby villages that were imprisoned at Loka Castle.

References

External links
Trnje at Geopedia

Populated places in the Municipality of Škofja Loka